Columbia Heights is a neighborhood in southeastern Lexington, Kentucky, United States. Its boundaries are the University of Kentucky to the south, Woodland Avenue to the west, Euclid Avenue to the north, and Marquis Avenue to the east.

Neighborhood statistics
 Area: 
 Population: 1,063
 Population density: 11,766 people per square mile
 Median household income: $22,932

External links
http://www.city-data.com/neighborhood/Columbia-Heights-Lexington-KY.html

Neighborhoods in Lexington, Kentucky